Spring City 66 is a complex of two skyscrapers and a shopping center in Kunming, Yunnan, China. Construction started in 2013 and is expected to be completed in 2019. The complex is also known as Hang Lung Plaza, Kunming. Hang Lung Properties are the developers of the project.

See also
List of tallest buildings in China

References

Skyscrapers in Kunming
Skyscraper office buildings in China